Aljamdu is a town in western Gambia. It is located in Upper Niumi District in the North Bank Division.  As of 2008, it has an estimated population of 1,100.

Philanthropy 
Over 2000 volunteers from Aljamdu village converged at Sheikh Professor Alhaji Dr Yahya Jammeh's 3.5 hectares rice farm, located at the eastern part of the village to work and harvest more rice.

References

External links
Satellite map at Maplandia.com

Populated places in the Gambia
Upper Niumi